The men's individual was an archery event held as part of the Archery at the 1996 Summer Olympics programme. Like other archery events at the Olympics, it featured the recurve discipline. All archery was done at a range of 70 metres. 64 archers competed.

The same basic competition format as in 1992 was used, though there were some significant changes. The competition began with a 72-arrow ranking round (down from 144 arrows in 1992).  This was followed by three elimination rounds (up from two in 1992; the increase allowed every archer to advance to the elimination), in which archers competed head-to-head in 18-arrow matches (up from 12 arrows in 1992). After these rounds, there were 8 archers left. The quarterfinals, semifinals, and medal matches (collectively termed the "finals round") were 12-arrow matches.  In all matches, losers were eliminated and received a final rank determined by their score in that round, with the exception of the semifinals. The losers of the semifinals competed in the bronze medal match.

Records

Michele Frangilli's score of 170 in the round of 16 was an Olympic record for 18 arrows.  Oh Kyo-Moon's score of 336 was an Olympic record for 36 arrows, R32 and R16 combined. Oh's score of 115 in the bronze medal match was an Olympic record for a 12-arrow match, as well as combining with the 114 and 109 to set a world record at 338 for the 36 arrow final round.

Results

Competition bracket

Section 1

Section 2

Section 3

Section 4

Finals

References

Sources
 Official Report
 

Archery at the 1996 Summer Olympics
Men's events at the 1996 Summer Olympics